Group 6, numbered by IUPAC style, is a group of elements in the periodic table. Its members are chromium (Cr), molybdenum (Mo), tungsten (W), and seaborgium (Sg). These are all transition metals and chromium, molybdenum and tungsten are refractory metals.

The electron configuration of these elements do not follow a unified trend, though the outermost shells do correlate with trends in chemical behavior:

"Group 6" is the new IUPAC name for this group; the old style name was "group VIB" in the old US system (CAS) or "group VIA" in the European system (old IUPAC). Group 6 must not be confused with the group with the old-style group crossed names of either VIA (US system, CAS) or VIB (European system, old IUPAC). That group is now called group 16.

History

Discoveries
Chromium was first reported on July 26, 1761, when Johann Gottlob Lehmann found an orange-red mineral in the Beryozovskoye mines in the Ural Mountains of Russia, which he named "Siberian red lead," which was found out in less than 10 years to be a bright yellow pigment. Though misidentified as a lead compound with selenium and iron components, the mineral was crocoite with a formula of PbCrO4. Studying the mineral in 1797, Louis Nicolas Vauquelin produced chromium trioxide by mixing crocoite with hydrochloric acid, and metallic chromium by heating the oxide in a charcoal oven a year later. He was also able to detect traces of chromium in precious gemstones, such as ruby or emerald.

Molybdenite—the principal ore from which molybdenum is now extracted—was previously known as molybdena, which was confused with and often implemented as though it were graphite. Like graphite, molybdenite can be used to blacken a surface or as a solid lubricant. Even when molybdena was distinguishable from graphite, it was still confused with a galena (a common lead ore), which took its name from Ancient Greek  , meaning lead. It was not until 1778 that Swedish chemist Carl Wilhelm Scheele realized that molybdena was neither graphite nor lead. He and other chemists then correctly assumed that it was the ore of a distinct new element, named molybdenum for the mineral in which it was discovered. Peter Jacob Hjelm successfully isolated molybdenum by using carbon and linseed oil in 1781.

Regarding tungsten, in 1781 Carl Wilhelm Scheele discovered that a new acid, tungstic acid, could be made from scheelite (at the time named tungsten). Scheele and Torbern Bergman suggested that it might be possible to obtain a new metal by reducing this acid. In 1783, José and Fausto Elhuyar found an acid made from wolframite that was identical to tungstic acid. Later that year, in Spain, the brothers succeeded in isolating tungsten by reduction of this acid with charcoal, and they are credited with the discovery of the element.

Seaborgium was first produced by a team of scientists led by Albert Ghiorso who worked at the Lawrence Berkeley Laboratory in Berkeley, California, in 1974. They created seaborgium by bombarding atoms of californium-249 with ions of oxygen-18 until seaborgium-263 was produced.

Historical development and uses
During the 1800s, chromium was primarily used as a component of paints and in tanning salts. At first, crocoite from Russia was the main source, but in 1827, a larger chromite deposit was discovered near Baltimore, United States. This made the United States the largest producer of chromium products until 1848 when large deposits of chromite where found near Bursa, Turkey. Chromium was used for electroplating as early as 1848, but this use only became widespread with the development of an improved process in 1924.

For about a century after its isolation, molybdenum had no industrial use, owing to its relative scarcity, difficulty extracting the pure metal, and the immaturity of the metallurgical subfield. Early molybdenum steel alloys showed great promise in their increased hardness, but efforts were hampered by inconsistent results and a tendency toward brittleness and recrystallization. In 1906, William D. Coolidge filed a patent for rendering molybdenum ductile, leading to its use as a heating element for high-temperature furnaces and as a support for tungsten-filament light bulbs; oxide formation and degradation require that moly be physically sealed or held in an inert gas. In 1913, Frank E. Elmore developed a flotation process to recover molybdenite from ores; flotation remains the primary isolation process. During the first World War, demand for molybdenum spiked; it was used both in armor plating and as a substitute for tungsten in high-speed steels. Some British tanks were protected by 75 mm (3 in) manganese steel plating, but this proved to be ineffective. The manganese steel plates were replaced with 25 mm (1 in) molybdenum-steel plating allowing for higher speed, greater maneuverability, and better protection. After the war, demand plummeted until metallurgical advances allowed extensive development of peacetime applications. In World War II, molybdenum again saw strategic importance as a substitute for tungsten in steel alloys.

In World War II, tungsten played a significant role in background political dealings. Portugal, as the main European source of the element, was put under pressure from both sides, because of its deposits of wolframite ore at Panasqueira. Tungsten's resistance to high temperatures and its strengthening of alloys made it an important raw material for the arms industry.

Chemistry
Unlike other groups, the members of this family do not show patterns in its electron configuration, as two lighter members of the group are exceptions from the Aufbau principle:

Most of the chemistry has been observed only for the first three members of the group. The chemistry of seaborgium is not very established and therefore the rest of the section deals only with its upper neighbors in the periodic table. The elements in the group, like those of groups 7–11, have high melting points, and form volatile compounds in higher oxidation states. All the elements of the group are relatively nonreactive metals with a high melting points (1907 °C, 2477 °C, 3422 °C); that of tungsten is the highest of all metals. The metals form  compounds in different oxidation states: chromium forms compounds in all states from −2 to +6: disodium pentacarbonylchromate,  disodium decacarbonyldichromate, bis(benzene)chromium, tripotassium pentanitrocyanochromate, chromium(II) chloride, chromium(III) oxide, chromium(IV) chloride, potassium tetraperoxochromate(V), and chromium(VI) dichloride dioxide; the same is also true for molybdenum and tungsten, but the stability of the +6 state grows down the group. Depending on oxidation states, the compounds are basic, amphoteric, or acidic; the acidity grows with the oxidation state of the metal.

Occurrence
Chromium is a very common naturally occurring element. It is the 21st most abundant element in the Earth's crust with an average concentration of 100ppm. The most common oxidation states for chromium are zero, trivalent, and hexavalent states. Most naturally occurring chromium is in the hexavalent state. About two-fifths of the worlds chromium are produced in South Africa, with Kazakhstan, India, Russia, and Turkey following. Chromium is mined as chromite ore.

Tungsten is one of the more rare elements in earth. It has an average concentration of 1.5ppm in Earth's crust. Tungsten is mainly found in the minerals wolframite and scheelite, it usually never occurs as a free element in nature. The largest producers of Tungsten in the world are China, Russia, and Portugal

Seaborgium is not found in nature but made in a laboratory.

Production

Precautions
Hexavalent chromium compounds are genotoxic carcinogens. Seaborgium is a radioactive synthetic element that is not found in nature; the most stable known isotope has a half-life of approximately 14 minutes.

Applications
 Alloys
 Catalysts
 High temperature and refractory applications, such as welding electrodes and kiln components.
 Metallurgy, sometimes used in jet engines and gas turbines.
 Dyes and pigments
 Tanning
 hard materials

Biological occurrences
Group 6 is notable in that it contains some of the only elements in periods 5 and 6 with a known role in the biological chemistry of living organisms: molybdenum is common in enzymes of many organisms, and tungsten has been identified in an analogous role in enzymes from some archaea, such as Pyrococcus furiosus. In contrast, and unusually for a first-row d-block transition metal, chromium appears to have few biological roles, although it is thought to form part of the glucose metabolism enzyme in some mammals.

References

See also

Groups (periodic table)